Richard Thompson Buckler (October 27, 1865 – January 23, 1950) was a Representative from Minnesota. He was born on a farm near Oakland, Coles County, Illinois. He attended the public schools and engaged in agricultural pursuits in Coles County before moving to Andover Township, Polk County, Minnesota in 1904 where he continued agricultural pursuits.

He was active in Farm Bureau and Farmers’ Union organizations and held numerous township and local school district offices, serving in the Minnesota Senate 1915-1919, 1923-1927, and 1931-1933.  Buckler was elected on the Farmer-Labor ticket to the 74th, 75th, 76th, and 77th congresses, (January 3, 1935 – January 3, 1943) but was not a candidate for renomination in 1942.  After his political career ended, he resumed agricultural pursuits.  Buckler died in Crookston, Minnesota, January 23, 1950, with interment in Oakdale Cemetery.

References

Members of the United States House of Representatives from Minnesota
People from Oakland, Illinois
1865 births
1950 deaths
Minnesota state senators
Minnesota Farmer–Laborites
Farmer–Labor Party members of the United States House of Representatives